Patania jatingaensis is a moth in the family Crambidae. It was described by Rose and Singh in 1989. It is found in India (Assam).

References

Moths described in 1989
Spilomelinae
Moths of Asia